Margery Binner (3 September 1908 – 16 March 1948) was a British stage and film actress.

Selected filmography
 Almost a Divorce (1931)
 A Honeymoon Adventure (1931)
 The Officers' Mess (1931)
 Love on the Spot (1932)
 The Good Companions (1933)

References

Bibliography
 Wearing, J. P. The London Stage 1920-1929: A Calendar of Productions, Performers, and Personnel. Rowman & Littlefield, 2014.

External links

1908 births
1948 deaths
British film actresses
British stage actresses
People from Teddington